The 1990 United States Senate election in Arkansas was held on November 6, 1990. Incumbent Democratic U.S. Senator David Pryor won re-election uncontested.

Candidates

Democratic 
 David Pryor, incumbent U.S. Senator

Results

See also 
 1990 United States Senate elections

References 

Arkansas
1990
1990 Arkansas elections